The Jeepers Creepers film series consists of four American horror movies. The first three movies were written and directed by Victor Salva, and the fourth was directed by Timo Vuorensola. The antagonist in each of the films is the Creeper, a demonic serial killer played by Jonathan Breck in the first three entries and Jarreau Benjamin in the fourth. The first film, starring Gina Philips and Justin Long, was a commercial success at the box office in 2001 and received somewhat positive reviews from critics and a nomination for the Saturn Award for Best Horror Film. The succeeding entries in the series, consisting of a sequel, interquel, and reboot, were not well received.

Films

Jeepers Creepers (2001)

In Florida, Trish Jenner (Gina Philips) and her brother Darry (Justin Long) are traveling home from college for spring break. On the road, they spot the driver of an old truck dumping several bodies into a large pipe outside an abandoned church. Deciding to investigate, Darry finds a lair containing hundreds of dead bodies. At a diner, the pair receive a call from Jezelle Gay Hartman (Patricia Belcher), a woman who tells them that they are going to be tracked down by the driver, revealed to be an ancient demonic creature known as the Creeper (Jonathan Breck) who kills and eats people every twenty-three years for twenty-three days. Searching for help at a police station, the brother-and-sister duo meets Jezelle, who warns them again before the Creeper arrives. After a chase, the Creeper captures Darry and flies away with him, leaving Trish depressed and in shock.

Jeepers Creepers 2 (2003)

On its twenty-second day of feeding, the Creeper abducts a young Billy Taggart (Shaun Fleming) to the horror of his father Jack (Ray Wise) and older brother Jack Jr (Luke Edwards). The next day, the Creeper disables a school bus carrying a high school basketball team by blowing its tires with hand-crafted shurikens. After experiencing visions of Billy Taggart and Darry Jenner, cheerleader Minxie Hayes (Nicki Aycox) tells the rest of the students about the Creeper, and that the creature will go into a hibernation state at the ending of its twenty-third day of feeding. Soon after, the Creeper abducts bus driver Betty Borman (Diane Delano) and coaches Charlie Hanna (Thom Gossom Jr.) and Dwayne Barnes (Tom Tarantini), leaving the students stranded. After various students are killed by the Creeper, the Taggarts begin their search for the bus. Once there, Jack manages to shoot the Creeper in the head with a harpoon. However, the Creeper goes into its hibernation state before it can die, leaving Jack unsatisfied. Twenty-three years later, an elderly Jack awaits for the Creeper, which he kept in his farm as a sideshow attraction, to return to life for the chance to kill it.

Jeepers Creepers 3 (2017)

At night, Kenny Brandon (Jordan Salloum) watches as a man manages to cut the Creeper's hand off before being taken away. Twenty-three years later, Sheriff Dan Tashtego (Stan Shaw) and Sergeant Davis Tubbs (Brandon Smith) begin an investigation on the Creeper after the abduction of Darry Jenner. The next day, Kenny's mother Gaylen (Meg Foster) sees a vision of Kenny, who was killed by the Creeper. He warns her to move away due to the Creeper searching for its severed hand, which contains information about its identity. Meanwhile, Gaylen's granddaughter Addison (Gabrielle Haugh) is captured by the Creeper to the dismay of her friend Buddy Hooks (Chester Rushing). Ignoring the warning, Gaylen touches the severed hand, learns about who the Creeper is through visions, and gives the hand to Tashtego and Tubbs, who inspect it with other authorities. While the Creeper kills various police officers along with Tashtego, Addison manages to escape from the Creeper's truck, reuniting with Gaylen and Buddy. The next day, Buddy leaves for a high school basketball game on the same bus later attacked by the Creeper shortly before its hibernation.

Jeepers Creepers: Reborn (2022)

In Louisiana, the Horror Hound festival holds its first event in the state. Among the attendees include Chase and his girlfriend Laine, who begins to experience disturbing visions associated with the town's past and the Creeper. As the festival begins and the entertainment builds to a frenzy, Laine believes that something unearthly has been summoned.

Cast and crew

Cast
 A dark grey cell indicates the character has not appeared in that medium. 

 A  indicates an appearance as an older version of a pre-existing character.

 A  indicates a cameo appearance.

Additional crew and production details

Production
The Jeepers Creepers film series originated from Victor Salva, who wrote and directed the original film of the same name. Financed by the German companies Cinerenta-Cinebeta and Cinerenta Medienbeteiligungs KG, American Zoetrope was originally going to cast A-list actors for the lead roles but executive producer Francis Ford Coppola convinced the studio to hire Gina Philips and Justin Long instead, actors who Salva believed were best for the roles as Trish and Darry Jenner. The role of the Creeper was written specifically for Lance Henriksen. After Henriksen dropped out of the project, Jonathan Breck was cast mainly for his audition, which stood out to Salva because Breck unexpectedly attended it with a shaven head after sending the film crew various head shots of himself with hair; when questioned, he told Salva that the "character wouldn't have hair". With Eileen Brennan and Patricia Belcher cast in supporting roles, Salva decided to make a cameo appearance as with most of his films. Using elements from Night of the Living Dead (1968) and Duel (1971), filming took place in Central Florida for two months with cinematographer Don E. FauntLeRoy. Produced on a budget of $10 million and using music composed by Bennett Salvay, Jeepers Creepers was released by United Artists and MGM Distribution Co. on August 31, 2001.

In 2002, American Zoetrope and Myriad Pictures announced the development of Jeepers Creepers 2 with Salva and Coppola returning to their respective duties. Principal photography took place that same year, with production concluding in July. With Ray Wise cast in a lead role, the production budget for the project was larger than the original at $17 million. Long also returned to the franchise in a cameo, reprising his role as Darry. Jeepers Creepers 2 was released by United Artists and MGM on August 29, 2003.

On September 11, 2015, a third film was officially greenlit to begin production under the working title Jeepers Creepers 3: Cathedral, shortly after Salva shared his intentions in making a film focusing extensively on the return of Philips as Trish Jenner. However, his original script was rewritten, and the film was released in 2017 by Screen Media Films as simply Jeepers Creepers 3 on one-night screenings on September 26, and on October 4, with Phillips making a cameo appearance instead. Along with mixed reviews from critics, the film sparked controversy over a joke about child molestation, due to Salva's past as a convicted sex offender, which was later removed from various screenings.

Prior to the release of Jeepers Creepers 3, Phillips said in an interview that Salva had completed a script for a possible fourth film. However, the project from Salva did not move forward, and on February 24, 2021, it was announced that a fourth film, containing no involvement from Salva, would be released as Jeepers Creepers: Reborn by Screen Media Films. Written by Sean Michael Argo and directed by Timo Vuorensola, the film serves as the first film of a new trilogy. It was released on September 19, 2022.

Reception

Box office performance

Critical and public response

Accolades

References

External links
 
 
 
 

 
Horror film series
Monster movies
Film series introduced in 2001
2000s English-language films
2010s English-language films
2020s English-language films